Darmirra Brunson is an American actress, comedian and singer. She is best known for her role as Drew in the new sitcom Love Thy Neighbor.

Career
In 2013, she joined the cast of the new sitcom Tyler Perry's Love Thy Neighbor. She has her own show on YouTube, called The Darmirra Show where she performs numerous spot-on impressions of her celebrities such as Beyoncé Knowles, Azealia Banks, Wendy Williams, Sway Calloway, Heidi Montag, DMX, Kanye West, Kelly Rowland, Lil' Kim, Remy Ma, Whitney Houston, Nicki Minaj, Rihanna and Mariah Carey and Iggy Azalea. She also does some of her original characters like Gretchen Murdle, Larry Steinburg and Aquafina.

Filmography

References

External links
 

Living people
American television actresses
Actresses from Baltimore
21st-century American actresses
American film actresses
American Internet celebrities
American women comedians
African-American actresses
1986 births
21st-century American comedians
African-American female comedians
21st-century African-American women
21st-century African-American people
20th-century African-American people
20th-century African-American women